Hernando Delgado (born 5 November 1937) is a Spanish wrestler. He competed in the men's Greco-Roman lightweight at the 1960 Summer Olympics.

References

External links
 

1937 births
Living people
Spanish male sport wrestlers
Olympic wrestlers of Spain
Wrestlers at the 1960 Summer Olympics
Sportspeople from Madrid
20th-century Spanish people